Germa is an ancient town now in Libya.

Germa may also refer to:
Germa (Galatia), a town of ancient Galatia, now in Turkey
Germa (Mysia), a town of ancient Mysia, now in Turkey

See also 
 Jerma (disambiguation)